The 2022 Delaware State Treasurer election took place on November 8, 2022, to elect the next Delaware State Treasurer. Incumbent Democratic Party Treasurer Colleen Davis won re-election to a second term.

Democratic primary

Candidates

Nominee
Colleen Davis, incumbent treasurer

Republican primary

Candidates

Nominee
Greg Coverdale, financial counselor

General election

Results

References

State Treasurer
Delaware